The manga series Food Wars!: Shokugeki no Soma, features an extensive cast of characters created by Yuto Tsukuda and illustrated by Shun Saeki. The series primarily takes place at Totsuki Saryo Culinary Institute, an extremely competitive culinary school of which only a handful of students graduate each year. Students are judged on their cooking in a number of classes and events. Of particular interest is a competition called a shokugeki (food war), a cooking duel held in an indoor arena where students stake their pride and futures as chefs. The storyline follows teenage transfer student Soma Yukihira as he meets other students, some of whom start as rivals and antagonists, especially Erina Nakiri, the granddaughter of the school's dean, but later become allies when the story shifts in the 16th tankōbon volume with the arrival of Azami Nakiri, who brings sweeping changes to the school; and after the 30th tankōbon volume, with the introduction of a group of chefs called Le Cuisine Noir. It also includes characters from the epilogue chapters in Le Dessert.

Development 
When asked at Anime Expo about the diversity of characters, writer Yuto Tsukuda said "That was very important to me. I wanted the younger readers experiencing this manga to learn about different types of food and culture from different countries. I thought it would be great if kids reading the manga could grow up, travel the world, see unique dishes and remember, 'I saw that in Food Wars! when I was a kid.' "

The concept of the clothes falling off originated from "the idea of a girl eating food, and she expresses herself about the food with 'ecstasy'," but Tsukuda also realized early on that it meant they could also portray the male characters with clothes removed.

At Crunchyroll Expo 2019, Tsukuda said that he wanted to originally end the series soon after the Central arc, since it had shown that the growth of the key characters: "Soma's mental growth, Megumi's achievement of independence and Erina's development". However, he had doubts with have to resolve the relationship between Soma and Erina, so he rewrote the epilogue chapter for that several times before settling with the final.

Main characters

Soma Yukihira

 is a 15-year-old chef who has been working at his father Joichiro's diner, Yukihira Family Restaurant, since he was a young child. His main goal in cooking is to provide the customer with any dish they order anytime they want. When his father closes the diner to work overseas, Soma enrolls in the Totsuki Saryo Culinary Institute, but is given a failing grade in the entrance exam by Erina Nakiri. Even so, Erina's grandfather Senzaemon, the Headmaster of the academy, accepts him. Soma then declares during the entering class's ceremony that he will win the top spot in the school. He resides in Polaris Dorm. In his first year, he makes friends with his classmates and competitors through training camp, the Fall Classic tournament, and Stagiaire training.

Soma enjoys experimenting with dishes, which often have horrible tastes, but sees it as a learning opportunity. He is normally laid back but is not afraid of any cooking challenge. He does not have a particular specialty, but can create free-style and innovative dishes to clash with other chefs in order to continuously improve himself.

When Azami takes over as Dean of Totsuki, Soma becomes part of the resistance movement against Azami's Central organization in various shokugeki against the Council members still in power. Following the Rebels' victory, Erina appoints Soma as the First Seat in the Council of Ten.

Tsukuda describes Soma's role as: "his whole world is the restaurant – but once he leaves, that's when he starts to understand. Now he has a base of comparison for the restaurant. It gets at the core of what Food Wars! is." There is chance of romance with Erina Let's see in final season of the show what will "happen" ? ." He also said that Soma treating everyone equally is also part of his personality. Tsukuda says that he wanted to create a character that could excite women with his skills, but be focused on his art, so he would not be distracted by those girls easily, and that his cavalier attitude would thus appeal to the girls. He likens Soma to a willow tree, "who is very flexible and can go up against any challenges".

Erina Nakiri

 is a first-year student at Totsuki and the granddaughter of the school's director Senzaemon. She was the valedictorian of Totsuki's junior high and is the youngest student to join the school's Council of Ten Masters. She has long strawberry blond hair. She is renowned for her extremely delicate and refined palate, called Divine Tongue (anime: God's Tongue), and is highly respected as a food taster from the top restaurants in Japan; those whose dishes are judged incompetent have their reputations forever tarnished. She presides over the transfer student candidates' entrance exam where she rejects Soma because of his commoner background, but is later annoyed that he was admitted to the school anyway. She then vows to make his life miserable.

She was abused by her father Azami in her childhood when he was molding her Divine Tongue. When Azami takes over as Dean, Erina escapes to Polaris Dorm, and discovers Soma is the son of Joichiro Saiba, a Totsuki alumnus she highly admires. Not wanting to serve under Azami any longer, she leaves the Council and leads the rebel team.

Eventually, after winning the Regimént de Cuisine, she becomes the new headmaster of Totsuki. Four months later when she was being put into a bet by Asahi for the upcoming BLUE, Erina has an opportunity to meet Mana, her mother she hates for abandoning her and causes Azami to go mad as well. As Erina progresses with a perfect win streak at the BLUE tournament, it eventually leads her to the truth from Asahi Saiba that the curse of God's Tongue is affecting her mother and it is the main reason for her father's descend into madness and Erina inherited her mother's former curse. Thanks to Soma, Erina 
finally lightens up once more and completely recovers from the God's Tongue curse, eventually winning the BLUE tournament (by default). Two years in the third year where Soma remains overseas, Erina and Hisako are just in time to ask Joichiro about his late-wife Tamako. She was ashamed of her father's irresponsibility when she learned from him that Asahi is her older half-brother and was tired seeing him gloomy and moping, and eventually wants welcome her brother to the Nakiri family alongside welcoming her biological parents back, finally ends her family's tragedies from being loners anymore.

Tsukuda said that Erina is Soma's opposite when it comes to rival characters.

Megumi Tadokoro

 is Soma's best friend and classmate at Totsuki and next-door dormmate at Polaris. Hoping to help her family's bed-and-breakfast the Shokei'en Inn, she leaves her snowy harbor town in the Tōhoku region, and enrolls in Totsuki's junior high program. However, her shyness and stage fright causes her to perform poorly; she ranks at the bottom of the class and is placed on academic probation at the start of her first high school year, and took three months to pass the Polaris Dorm entrance exam. After meeting Soma, Megumi gains confidence and courage, and her grades improve. She enjoys making comfort foods which impart feelings of familial love and nostalgia in those who taste her dishes. Outside of cooking, she is also a table tennis player, winning prefectural tournaments in elementary school and having turned down going to a sports junior high.

Along with Soma and Takumi, she is one of the three first-year rebels (apart from Erina) who passed the Promotional Exams. Megumi managed to overcome her trauma from Shinomiya, as the latter trained her to face the newly promoted 3rd Seat Momo Akanegakubo in the Regiment de Cuisine that would ultimately decide the fate of the academy. Four months after the Rebels' victory, she is promoted into the tenth seat of Council of Ten.

Tsukuda said that "Megumi Tadokoro is probably from some area in Tohoku Prefecture and has a slight Tohoku dialect, but I purposefully obscured it. This is because I don't necessarily want her to be seen as a stereotype. I actually got a comment from someone living in Tohoku who mentioned that her Aomori dialect is not right. But it hasn't been defined where Megumi is from, so it's not necessarily a bad thing".

Supporting characters

Polaris Dormitory  
Polaris Dormitory is a student residence within Totsuki, intended to house less affluent students. In order to become a resident, students must first cook a dish to the satisfaction of the dormitory manager Fumio. The dorm uses a series of speaking tubes, and its facilities include vegetable gardens, pens, and workshops. Because of the success of former students Gin Dojima and Joichiro Saiba (Soma's father), the dorm has become a "fully independent and profitable entity on its own". Other former residents include Jun Shiomi and Azami Nakamura.

Fumio Daimido  

, who goes by Miss Fumio, is the caretaker and dorm matron of Polaris; an elderly lady with greying, backwards-combed, spiked hair. As the "Maria of Polaris", she administers a cooking test that students must pass to become residents. At first glance she is intimidating and stern, but Fumio is actually a caring mother-figure to all the residents. Fumio has pride in the past achievements of the residents of the dormitory, which for a time held the top three seats on the Council of Ten. She still maintains contact with Gin, and will receive Joichiro on his sporadic visits.

Satoshi Isshiki
 
 is a second-year student at Polaris and the oldest student in the dorm. A handsome guy, he occupies the seventh seat of the Council of Ten. He has a few quirks such as visiting people's rooms through the ceiling tiles, and often appearing half-naked, wearing nothing but an apron and sometimes a fundoshi (thong loincloth). He supports his underclassmen at the dormitory, and strongly believes in enjoying youth, often waking them up to help with managing the dorm's back garden at the crack of dawn. While his tendencies and habits indicate a carefree, happy-go-lucky youth, he demonstrates immense cooking skills. He is popular among the food industry, especially with Orie Sendawara who flirtatiously recruits him to her business during the Fall Classic. Outside of cooking, Satoshi is talented in table tennis, comparable in skill to Megumi. He was born to a prestigious culinary family who owns a washoku restaurant in Gion, Kyoto, and is one of the two strongholds of traditional Japanese cuisine. As a child, Satoshi masters his family's culinary arts quickly but never receives any encouragement or praise from his imperious family; floundering him. When he was 4, his family sent him to train at the Kinokuni household.

After the sudden arrival of Azami, Satoshi is dismissed from the Council of Ten as he was not supportive of the decision to anoint him director of the academy, but manages to use his power in his remaining time as a member to deter any previous sabotage incidents in future matches. He then joins the rebel team in the Regiment de Cuisine against Central.  Four months after Rebels' victory, Satoshi returns to the Council once more and effectively promoted into the second seat.

Yuki Yoshino

 is a petite, energetic girl and a first-year resident in room 116. Characterised by her double-bun hairstyle and hyperactive attitude, she often acts childishly, teases the other students. Her specialty is cooking wild game, and to do so she raises and breeds a large number of game animals and poultry, including deer and boar, which she often lets roam freely in the dorm halls. A running gag shows her to be envious of well-endowed girls like her best friend Ryoko. In the anime, she has a habit of sticking her tongue out through her mouth.

When Azami takes over Totsuki, she is expelled from the school as a member of the rebel team during Azami's reign, but was reinstated after the Rebels won the Regiment de Cuisine.

Shun Ibusaki

 is a first-year resident, occupying room 208. He has messy hair that usually covers his eyes, and a quiet nature. His specialty is smoked food, where he is nicknamed the Prince of Smoke.

Shun was later defeated during the promotional exams and is expelled. He and his fellow expelled students are left to watch by the sidelines as Soma and the others take on Central in the Regiment de Cuisine.

Four months after the Rebels' victory, Shun was reinstated into the academy, where he received many Shokugeki challenges and won easily.

Zenji Marui

 is a first-year student who lives in room 205. He has bobbed hair and oversized glasses, and prefers to study quietly, however, his large room is often commandeered by his dorm-mates for parties and social activities. He is the star pupil of Professor Takao Miyazato's Seminar, despite being a first-year. Without innate special talents, and having below average physical strength and stamina, he uses knowledge to research cooking styles to make his dishes. His peers in the club call him "The Professor of Taste". During the Fall Classic preliminaries, he presents a potage-blanc curry udon, and places fifth overall in his block. In the anime Central arc, Marui won the Shokugeki against Central, and saved his home club.

Ryoko Sakaki

 is a tall, mature-looking girl with long red hair and large bust, residing in room 112. She is gentle and kind, acting like a big sister, responding to the eccentrics of the other Polaris residents in a level-headed manner and comforting the other students when they are troubled. Her specialty is shio koji (rice malt) and has a warehouse near the dorm where she does fermentation processing. Her parents owning a well-known fermented-goods shop, and she maintains a workshop near the dorms to produce her own ingredients. She also keeps a bottle of "fermented rice drink" that she would sometimes bring out during parties and celebrations, which Soma suspects is illegally brewed sake. In the anime series, her hair is purple and her eyes are orange. During the Fall Classic preliminaries, she presents a natto curry flavored with shoyu koji. The dish garners praise from the judges, who are reminded of a Japanese festival. She ultimately finishes seventh in her block.

Daigo Aoki and Shoji Sato
 (Daigo) 
 (Shōji)

These two fought since they were in middle school when Aoki stole Sato's favorite toy. During one of their cook-offs, Aoki thought it would be funny to get revenge by ruining one of Sato's dishes by adding salt to it.

Totsuki 92nd Generation students
The following students enrolled in Totsuki at the same year as Soma.

Hisako Arato

Erina's aide with short pink hair, whose name is revealed to be  during the Fall Classic preliminaries in chapter 52. She helps Erina with many of the administrative duties, having retained her position in her second year of junior high by defeating rival student Nao Sadatsuka in a shokugeki. She specializes in medicinal cooking, which is based on natural remedies and Chinese medicine to improve health. This comes from her family who is in the Chinese medicine business.

In the quarterfinals, she is defeated by Akira Hayama, who tells her that someone who only aims to be second could never beat him. This hurts her pride and causes her to take a leave of absence, feeling unworthy of being near Erina. When partnered with Soma for their first stagiaire assignment, she uses her administration skills to come up with an idea for the restaurant to better service its customers, and they pass their assignment. Afterwards, Soma encourages her to walk alongside Erina as an equal instead of following her, and she becomes more friendly with Soma.

Hisako once read an old cooking-magazine that featured Erina's father, Azami, but Hisako's own father warned her against ever asking about Azami. When Azami returns and replaces Senzaemon as the academy's director, Hisako is fired as Erina's aide and becomes extremely depressed. Hisako, Alice and Ryō convince Erina to leave the Nakiri mansion, taking shelter inside the Polaris Dormitory where Hisako reveals Erina's history. Hisako leaves Erina in their care, though she would visit every day to bring Erina a change of clothes.

Later, Hisako was defeated by Saito during the promotional exams and is expelled. She and her fellow expelled students are left to watch by the sidelines as Soma and the others take on Central in the Regiment de Cuisine and later her expulsion was rescind after the rebel won the Regiment de Cuisine. Four months after the Rebels' victory, she regain her position as Erina's aide once more. Hisako and Isami then become candidates for the Council.

In the footnotes for chapter 52, Hisako is regarded by the story writer that by looks alone, she is "one of the prettiest traditional beauties in the series."

Ikumi Mito  

 is a first-year student with blonde hair and dark skin who often wears a variety of flamboyant bikini tops covered by a tied dress shirt. Known as the "Master of Meat", she is among the top students of her year, with her meat-based dishes always scoring A's. She strongly dislikes the nickname "Nikumi", a portmanteau of the Japanese word for "meat" and her given name. She is the heir to a large meat distributor and conglomerate, which has a near-monopoly on the national beef market, allowing her access to exceptionally high-quality ingredients, especially A5 grade beef, which is so tender that it doesn't have to be chewed. Nikumi's talent with meat lies in her incredibly sensitive lips, allowing her to accurately judge the temperature of meat with a single taste.

She initially appears as a representative of Erina in trying to drive out the Donburi Bowl Research Society, but loses a shokugeki to Soma, and is forced to join the club. She develops a crush on Soma afterwards, and helps him save his local business district from a competing fried chicken chain store. At the time of the Moon Festival, the Donburi Society has expanded, mostly because of her appeal to the junior high students, her club places third in sales for her area on the first day. Nikumi opposes the new curriculum of the Azami Administration, and was able to win a Shokugeki to save the Donburi club. However, targeted as a rebel during Central's Promotional Exams, she was defeated by Momo on the third exam and expelled. She and her fellow expelled students are left to watch by the sidelines as Soma and the others take on Central in the Regiment de Cuisine, and returns to the school after the Rebels win.

Takumi Aldini

 is a chef from Florence, Italy; he has blond hair and blue eyes, coming from an Italian mother and Japanese father. He initiates a rivalry with Soma, viewing him as someone similar to himself. He has worked along with his twin brother Isami since they were five years old at their uncle's restaurant, and transfer into Totsuki's Junior High in their second year. His specialty is Italian cuisine, although he retains a broad vision that lets him incorporate ingredients and methods from other culinary styles to create inventive dishes, much like Soma. He is noted as being extremely handsome, having fan clubs in his hometown and at the school.

During the Fall Classic, Takumi is provoked by Subaru Mimasaka to turn his quarterfinal match into a shokugeki where he wagers his mezzaluna. However, when Subaru copies his lemon semifreddo recipe and improves on it, Takumi scrambles to change his version, but Subaru anticipates that move as well, and Takumi loses. Although Soma is able to win the knife back, Takumi has Soma hang on to it until he can face him in a later match.

Takumi survives the botched 3rd phase of the Promotional Exams under Azami's Central, along with Megumi and Soma. He eventually learnt that Eizan was the mastermind for his humiliating defeat back in the Fall Classics, prompting him to pick Eizan as his opponent for a revenge match in the Regiment de Cuisine. He demonstrated his resolve and growth in the match; ironically, by using stalking tips from Mimasaka.

Four months after Rebels' victory, Takumi is promoted to the seventh seat, honorably succeeding Isshiki while dethroning Eizan into eight seat, who was pardoned on behalf of Soma's wisdom.  Some time in the four months after the fall of the Azami Administration right before he, Soma and Megumi being invited to BLUE, Takumi regained his Mezzaluna from the result matches between him and Soma, where Soma learnt how to use the said two-gripped knife, just in case if Takumi's team-based match being sabotage, which is eventually happening in BLUE where Isami being kidnapped by one of the Le Cuisine members, and both Takumi and Soma manage to counter the sabotage until Isami being found and rescued just in time. He is defeated by Erina in semi-final, and alongside Soma realize she is somehow revert to her bitter-self ever since she met her mother Mana again. During a semi-final between Soma and Asahi, Takumi and his friends finally learned from a redeemed Azami behind his downfall during his Central regime was because of the God's Tongue curse started from his wife Mana, and now Erina inherit the curse from her.

Many years after the BLUE is over where Erina has fully recovered from the God's Tongue curse and becoming its champion, then he and other Jewel Generation students graduate, as well as Asahi (who revealed to be Erina's older half-brother) is welcomed to Nakiri family by his half-sister, Takumi and Isami opens a limited-day branch of Trattoria Aldini at Japan whether they visited there.

Takumi and his brother Isami are the main characters of the Shokugeki no Soma – Fratelli Aldini spinoff manga which focuses on their time in Italy before going to Totsuki.

Isami Aldini

 is Takumi's younger twin brother; but he has dark hair and is overweight at the first-year camp, He too has worked at his uncle's restaurant in Italy since they were five, and strives to be praised for his cooking like Takumi. The spin-off manga Shokugeki no Soma – Fratelli Aldini focuses on the brothers' time in Italy. He and Takumi transfer to Totsuki's junior high program in their second year.

At the Fall Classic preliminaries, he is noticeably thinner in appearance (claiming it is due to him burning off the excess fat over every summer). During the Moon Festival, he and Takumi open a booth, naming it a branch of Trattoria Aldini, and gained first place in sales in their area. He later supports Takumi as they help Soma gain top sales in his area. He is targeted as a rebel by the Azami Administration's Promotional Exams, defeated by Eishi on the third exam and expelled. Isami and his fellow expelled students are left to watch by the sidelines as Soma and the others take on Central in the Regiment de Cuisine and later his expulsion was rescind after the rebel won the Regiment de Cuisine.

Four months after Central has fallen, at the same time when an illegal group of dark chefs Le Cuisine Noir emerged from the shadows, and BLUE is about to start, both Isami and Hisako become a potential Ten Council member candidates.

Alice Nakiri

 is Erina Nakiri's cousin, introduced in the first-year cooking camp. She is albino and has short light hair. Her mother is Danish and her father is Japanese. She lived with Erina while her father went to Denmark to found a culinary research organization focused on molecular gastronomy, a scientific approach to cooking. At five years old, she joins her parents there, and wins many awards in gastronomy. She returns to Japan to enroll in Totsuki's junior high at age 14 with the intent of besting Erina and taking the top spot in the school.

Like Erina, Alice has a haughty attitude, but she is more concerned about her image, often checking with her aide that he has positioned himself to present her with the perfect angle. Unlike Erina, Alice is much more friendly and sociable with her competition. She likes to tease Erina for her lack of knowledge on common matters such as dating and romance, but she herself also lacks that experience.

Alice's dishes look like art pieces. At the cooking camp, she presents a trio of egg dishes which turn out to be different from their appearances, and in the Fall Classic preliminaries, she presents a strange looking curry dish that scores the highest among the chefs. However, in the quarterfinals, she loses to Soma because her bento dish merely showcases her skills and the food presented but does not fully utilize the novelty and features of a bento stack. At the Moon Festival, she uses a 3D printer to create chocolate sculptures to go with their dish.

Alice knew from her parents of Azami's cruel treatment toward Erina as well as the fact that he destroyed her letters to Erina. Alice, Ryō, and Hisako convince Erina to escape from the Nakiri mansion and shelter at the Polaris Dorm. She despises Azami and was not afraid to publicly berate him after Kurokiba managed to win his Shokugeki and save their Cutting Edge RS. During the Promotional Exams targeting the rebels, Alice and Ryō are defeated by the Council of Ten and expelled from the academy. She and her fellow expelled rebels only managed to watch from the sidelines as the others take on Central in the Regimental Shokugeki and later her expulsion was rescind after the rebel won the Regiment de Cuisine. Four months after the Rebels' victory, Alice is promoted to the sixth seat of Council of Ten, succeeding Nene Kinokuni.

Ryo Kurokiba

Alice Nakiri's aide, whose name is revealed to be  in chapter 53 during the Fall Classic preliminaries. As a young boy, he is the head chef of a pub by the docks in Denmark. At first, he appears to be inattentive, lazy, and subservient to Alice, quipping back at her and commenting in a deadpan manner, but his demeanor changes when he puts on his headband to cook: he takes on an aggressive appearance, with sharp eyes and a savage grin. He considers the kitchen to be a battlefield and that cooks should compete rather than cooperate. It is later revealed that he regularly competes with Alice and they are about even in results, with Alice having beat him for two years back in Denmark.

Ryo's specialty is seafood dishes, and his cooking has frequently been described as "violent" and "forceful", characterized by rich and sharp flavors. At the Fall Classic, Ryo places second in his block. He defeats Megumi in the quarterfinals of the tournament. His style of cooking is likened to a tiger compared to Akira Hayama's eagle, and his semifinal match results in a draw, leading to a three-way final with Akira and Soma. After losing to Akira, Ryō sought to improve his skills with spices at an Indian restaurant during the stagiaire period. Ryō later accompanies Alice in aiding Erina's escape from Azami at the Nakiri mansion. Ryō challenges a Central sophomore Rentarō Kusunoki to a Shokugeki for insults underestimating the freshmen chefs, defeating him and defended the Cutting Edge RS. However, Ryō and Alice are defeated by the Council of Ten during the Promotional Exams, and are expelled and later his expulsion was rescind after the rebel won the Regiment de Cuisine. He and his fellow expelled students are left to watch by the sidelines as Soma and the others take on Central in the Regiment de Cuisine. Four months after the Rebels' victory, Ryo is promoted to the fifth seat of Council of Ten, succeeding Somei Saito and Shoko Kaburagi, but continues his rivalry with Akira by constantly fighting over the fourth seat.

Nao Sadatsuka

 is a girl with long dark hair covering her face who is obsessed with Erina. She despises Hisako, after losing a shokugeki to her in junior high over who gets to be Erina's aide. She is then required to stay at least 50 meters from Erina at all times, but Nao still stalks Erina from afar and writes her 30 letters per day. Known as the Cauldron Witch, she specializes in dishes that involve boiling and simmering with ingredients that generate hideous smells, but taste good, making her earn the first high score in the Fall Classic preliminaries, although ultimately finishing eighth in her block. After Hisako upstages her, she starts obsessing over Hisako instead. During the academy's Moon Banquet Festival, Nao becomes friends with Soma due to their shared interest in making weird dishes. During a third year reveals that Nao joined the photography club.

Miyoko Hojo

 is the heir of a Chinese cuisine restaurant in Yokohama's Chinatown, Her specialty is Chinese techniques and wok maneuvers, although some of the guys admire her because she is busty and wears a cheongsam dress. Because she was looked down upon by the cooks at her father's restaurant because of her sex, she has a low opinion of men in general; she dislikes that Megumi credits her success in the shokugeki with Shinomiya to Soma. However, after Megumi advances to the quarterfinals, she tells her she will be rooting for her. She later appears at the Moon Festival, where she says that her relationship with the employees of her father's restaurant has started to improve since the Fall Classic. She also declined joining the school's Chinese Food Research Society because of its leader Kuga's narrow focus on Sichuan cuisine.

Akira Hayama

 is a first-year student and the assistant for Professor Jun Shiomi. He is a tall and handsome man with tanned skin and silver hair. He looks after Shiomi, covering her forgetfulness on things such as watering their spice plants. Akira specializes in curry dishes, with a wide knowledge of spices and aromas, taking Shiomi's theories and trying them in the kitchen. He can determine the condition of a curry pot without looking inside, and can also detect different kinds of spices by smell alone, Eight years prior to the series, he lives overseas in the slums as an orphan when he meets Jun Shiomi and warns her about diluted spices in a market. He moves to Japan where he is adopted by Shiomi's seminar professor Hayama and is given the name Akira by Shiomi. He lives with Shiomi while he develops his cooking skills, and is noted to be a very good student.

At the Fall Classic preliminaries, Akira receives the highest score in his block. He defeats Hisako in the quarterfinals, thinking her aspirations to be second to Erina are holding her back from winning. In the semifinals, his style of cooking is likened to an eagle as he competes against Ryo Kurakiba. His use of spices is likened to his deployment of cards in a trading card game battle. The result of the match is a draw, leading to a three-way final with Akira and Soma, which he eventually wins.

The Azami Administration disbanded the Shiomi seminar, compromised the seminar's business partnerships, and held their research data hostage to extort Akira's allegiance. Compelled by his love for Jun, Akira joined the ranks of Central as a temporary 9th seat on the Council of Ten, vowing to protect the Shiomi seminar, despite Jun's objection because Azami is not trustworthy. In the Promotional Exams, Akira is ordered to defeat Soma again. Though he seemed to have the upper hand, Dojima Gin noted that Akira had lost the desire to cook to make someone (i.e.: Jun) happy, harkening back to a similar warning by Gin to him back in the Fall Classics. Tasting Soma's dish, Akira realizes what he'd lost; and Akira thanks Soma for redeeming him, but knowing his lost meant he is expelled for his failure from beginning as a result due to his previous status as a blackmailed Central member. He and his fellow expelled students are left to watch by the sidelines as Soma and the others take on Central in the Regiment de Cuisine and later his expulsion was rescind after the rebel won the Regiment de Cuisine.

Four months after the Rebels' victory, and due to Akira's status from being forcefully siding with Central has been quickly cleared, he re-enters back to a now restored Council of Ten, while being ranked up to the fourth seat, succeeding Somei Saito and Momo Akanegakubo. It was revealed that he and Mimasaka were originally nominated to BLUE, but they declined for reasons. As for Hayama and presumably Mimasaka's declining reason from joining BLUE is that they saw Soma's surrender-less nature whether he win or lose against the higher-up chefs as their about to be graduate senior Tsukasa, realizing that they won't be at the same level as Soma.

After graduating, he became a presenter of teaching about the connection between human physiology and the foods’ fragrance, while also receive Gin's invitation to work at Totsuki Resort's administrations.

Subaru Mimasaka

The chef who secures the fourth spot in his block at the Fall Classic preliminaries,  is a heavily built student with hair styled in a braided mohawk. He provokes his opponents into shokugeki challenges in which they stake their best cooking knife and soundly defeats them. He has no specialty, but it is soon revealed that he painstakingly stalks his opponents, learning the dishes they plan to make, and then makes the identical dish with improvements. With this strategy, he has amassed 99 blades. He got this idea when he was 12 and he was copying dishes at his father's restaurant, but his father disliked that he was not making anything original. When he defeats his father by making an improved dish, his father sends him off to Totsuki (he believes it was to get rid of him as an annoyance) where he is recruited by Council member Etsuya Eizan.

By insulting Takumi and his brother, he turns his quarterfinal match in the Fall Classic into a shokugeki in which Takumi wagers his mezzaluna knife. Although the judges dislike his actions and methods, they declare Subaru the winner. He is challenged by Soma in which he wagers his 100 blades, but the latter circumvents Subaru's research by waiting until the competition starts to improve on his dish, and Subaru is defeated. He tries to leave Totsuki, but Soma convinces him to continue his studies, but to not crush other chef's prides. At the Moon Festival, he helps Soma produce more dishes, having copied his technique and practicing at Restaurant Yukihira.

During Azami's regime on "Promotional Exams", Subaru started out as neutral until the third half where most of Soma's rebel friends except Takumi and Megumi were expelled, after which Subaru joined the rebel team as its 8th member to repay his debt to Soma. He upgraded his copying skills to another level: like a flash from a strobe camera, he is now able to copy his opponents just by a brief glance. Despite his loss in the second bout, his opponent, Saito conceded that his upgraded trace skills had made Mimasaka so formidable that it was like facing his own shadow. Before the third bout of the Regiment match begin on day two, Mimasaka trains Soma, Takumi and Megumi in mock battles he could simulate after tracing the remaining Council of Ten members during his time training, especially from his previous second bout match against Saito.

Four months after the Rebels' victory against Azami's Central, shortly when an illegal chef group known as Le Cuisine Noir resurfaced from the shadow at the same time when blue was announced, Mimasaka is currently studying about culinaries. Despite not being elected as one of the newest Council of Ten Masters members, Mimasaka was somehow originally nominated to BLUE alongside the current Ten's fourth seat Hayama, but they declined for reasons. Mimasaka is likely have a same declining reason as Hayama from joining BLUE, as they saw Soma's surrender-less nature whether he win or lose against the higher-up chefs as their about to be graduate senior Tsukasa, realizing that they won't be at the same level as Soma.

Other Totsuki students

Kanichi Konishi
 

 is the second-year student and president of the Donburi Bowl Research Society. He has a pompadour hair style. When he first meets Soma, his club is on the verge of being disbanded because of ongoing pressure from Erina Nakiri, leading him with no choice but to have a shokugeki with one of her lackeys Ikumi Mito. When Soma wins the match, the club is saved, and Ikumi is forced to join as a member, during which Kanichi embarrasses her by acting like a doting parent. At the time of the Moon Festival, the Donburi Society gains more members, although mostly because of Mito's appeal to the junior high students.

Urara Kawashima
 
 is the master of ceremonies for the shokugeki competitions and other events at Totsuki. She greatly enjoys the attention she gets from her male fans and audience, and greatly dislikes it when other women take this attention from her. After the Azami takeover of Tōtsuki, Urara is one of the students to be brainwashed by Central but her malicious nature vanishes and after smelling Momo's Apple Tart, then eventually Rebels' victory.

Yua Sasaki

 is the other Master of Ceremonies at the Fall Classic during the preliminary round when the event is split into two blocks. Unlike Urara, she is fairly quiet, stutters and has trouble keeping the attention of the audience.

Mitsuru Sotsuda

 is a third-year student at Totsuki Junior High and a member of the Journalism Club. He worships Soma and follows him with his reporter equipment.

Tetsuji Kabutoyama

 is a second-year student known as "The Iron Skewer" for his skewer-cooking techniques. He has a shokugeki winning rate of 80%. He takes an interest in Soma after seeing his cooking during the Fall Classics, and is the first student to challenge Soma to a shokugeki after the latter was done with his stagiaire. After losing in a unanimous decision, he has to teach Soma all his skewering tricks. Tetsuji's skewer club participates in the Moon Festival by opening a stall that got second place in sales for their area on the first day. He opposes the disbandment of the club under the Azami Administration and challenges Eizan to a Shokugeki, betting his expulsion from Tōtsuki should he lose. However, Eizan's victory was announced before the judges even tasted the dishes, causing Tetsuji to accuse Eizan of bribery which he indirectly confirms. Nonetheless, Tetsuji is expelled. After Soma defeated Eizan in another rigged Shokugeki and Satoshi managed to create a fair Survival's Purge, many Rebels demanded Tetsuji's return to the academy. After Central is defeated that Tetsuji was revealed to have been reinstated back to Totsuki off-screen, and manage to graduate from the academy for two years.

Tōtsuki staff

Senzaemon Nakiri

 is Erina's grandfather, the patriarch of the Nakiri family, and the Dean of Tōtsuki Saryo Culinary Institute. He is known as the "Gastric Godfather" in the culinary world. He has the tendency of stripping his upper body clothing when he eats a good dish. Despite his appearance and reputation, he is reasonable and gives accurate commentary and assessment for the food he tastes without being overly critical to the losers.

Many years previously, Senzaemon and Gin noticed Joichiro Saiba's critical condition at the start of a tournament, and took upon themselves some of the blame for pressuring Joichiro into becoming mentally trapped in the creation of his dishes. Feeling Joichiro's talent was beyond the tasks of the academy, Senzaemon freed his former student to travel abroad and learn independently, a proposal Joichiro happily accepted, as well as Gin, whom Senzaemon offered him as the head of resort planner as a mean to atone their sins to ensure no one will face the same fate that befell Joichiro before. For a period thereafter, Senzaemon hired Joichiro as his private chef.

Six years after the incident of Mana losing her God's Tongue power and left Nakiri house, Senzaemon exiled his son-in-law, Azami, for his twisted way on saving Erina to get rid of the God's Tongue curse with an abusive methods. Senzaemon then became Erina's legal guardian, and had Azami's name struck from the Tōtsuki records. However, Azami returns with the majority of the Council of Ten votes to support Azami as headmaster and replaces Senzaemon. In the aftermath, Senzaemon revealed to Soma that he advised Joichiro to have him apply to the academy. Senzaemon remains active behind-the-scenes with Joichiro, working through tips from informants to take control from Azami. During the third bout of Regiment de Cuisine, it is revealed that most of the 92nd generation students were handpicked by Senzaemon, and that the former headmaster always put his faith in the students he trusts, as they are the one led by Soma who can undo the God's Tongue curse within Erina and her mother Mana. When Soma, Erina, Eishi and Rindō are the only chefs left on their respective teams, Senzaemon declares that the fifth bout would be the last, with the remaining members of each side required to make an hors d'oeuvre and entree. After the Rebels' victory, Senzaemon officially announced his retirement and appointed his granddaughter as the new headmistress with Soma's recommendation.

Sometime during his granddaughter's childhood life, he warned her about the existence of an illegal group of chefs known as Le Cuisiner Noir, including referring the reason why his daughter Mana unable to return to Nakiri household, relating to the God's Tongue curse, even Azami, the first witness of what happened to Mana knew about this.

Roland Chapelle

Roland Chapelle is a French chef and lecturer at Totsuki, head of its French Cuisine Division. He is nicknamed "The Chef Who Doesn't Smile" due to his high standards and stern demeanor, giving either A's or E's (lowest grade) in his class. Soma is one of the few students to ever make him smile from a dish, in which, Chapelle apologizes that he could not give a higher grade then an A.

Roland is among the staff first told of the Azami Administration's new curriculum, which leaves him shocked and ultimately in opposition to the "gourmet utopia" plan which he calls a dystopia. Roland is happy when Soma wins a critical Shokugeki against Eizan, who had bribed the judges, and believes that Soma and the other rebels will restore Tōtsuki's lost honor. After the second survivor purge, Roland is horrified at Azami's actions in brainwashing the middle-school chef students into copies of Azami. Four months after the Rebels' victory against Central in Regiment match, Roland is seen happily chatting with Jun.

Jun Shiomi

, age 34, is a professor at Totsuki who teaches second-year general classes and a seminar specializing in spices. An alumna of the 73rd graduating class and a former resident of Polaris during the dorm's golden age, she taste-tested many of Joichiro's cooking experiments, which left her traumatized enough to hate anything to do with him. She wears her hair in a ponytail and wears glasses, but her petite stature and dressing in T-shirts makes her appear like a junior high school student. She grows spices from all over the world in her lab. She is a very timid, shy, and reserved person, and klutzy, remarking that she barely graduated. While researching spices overseas at age 26, Jun meets Akira Hayama and, recognizing his talent, brings him to Japan to mentor and take care of him.

Under the Azami Administration, Jun's research seminar was threatened. Azami used this to extort Akira into joining Central, leaving Jun broken-hearted after trying to warn Akira that Azami cannot be trusted many times. Jun left the academy in protest, reappearing at Dojima Gin's invitation during the third phase of the Promotional Exams to witness Akira and Soma's match, where a repentant Hayama lost. Jun rebuked Akira for being reckless in joining Central and expressed that despite losing the research society, she only wanted him to continue to grow as a chef with his classmates and enjoy cooking from his heart. Four months after the Rebels' victory against Central in Regiment match, Jun finally re-open back her seminar, and is seen happily chatting with Roland, presumably chatting about how her seminar gained more members.

Takao Miyazato

 is the president of the Shokugeki Administration Bureau. He wears glasses and has a bushy mustache. He runs a seminar that focuses on the academic knowledge of culinary and gastronomical topics. Zenji Marui attends as a first-year and is one of his top students.

Totsuki alumni

Jōichirō Yukihira  

, born , is Soma's father and owner of Yukihira Family Restaurant. in the Sumire Shopping District. He teaches Soma the family business and challenges him to many cook-offs that have always ended in the former's victory. At the start of the series, he closes the diner in order to travel and work as a guest chef at the world's top restaurants. He sends Soma to Totsuki Saryo Culinary Institute, telling him that he needs to succeed there if he ever wants to surpass him.

As , he attended Totsuki under this name as a 69th generation student, Polaris resident, and occupied the second seat on the Council of Ten. As a Council of Ten member, Joichiro was regarded as a visionary by his peers and clients alike, due to his exceptional level and flair of cooking. He finished first in many Shokugekis and competitions alike, but this took a mental toll on him, as his clients wanted the next dish to be even better, such that he set high expectations for himself that he wanted to surpass each time. This eventually lead him to drop out of BLUE, because he didn't find cooking fun anymore. As a result, he left Totsuki after graduation and pursued cooking overseas and eventually re-ignited that passion he once had.

Gin Dojima

 is the head chef and company director of the Totsuki Resorts, first appearing in the camp event for the first-year students. A graduate of Totsuki's 69th class, he holds the record of the highest marks in the entire school, and has turned down offers to work for over 800 restaurants. He is a tall and extremely muscular man with a buzz cut, and had brown spikey hair in his youth.

Gin was a resident of the Polaris Dormitory with best-friend Joichiro, Jun and Azami, and held the top seat on the Council of Ten. He regards Joichiro highly, respecting his skill and his spirit as a chef. Gin believes that Jōichirō has better cooking skills, having a record of 20–101 in their matches. During Joichiro's last day of their third year at Tōtsuki, Gin and Senzaemon noticed Jōichiro's critical condition, blaming themselves for pressuring Jōichirō into becoming mentally trapped in the creation of his dishes. Gin agreed with Senzaemon's suggestion to release Joichiro from the academy so he could travel the world and let his talents grow naturally. Gin's current job in Tōtsuki as of the present was an offer from Senzaemon, in order to ensure none of the current and former students sharing the similar fates as Joichiro had and most importantly not to end up like Azami since Mana Nakiri's sudden departure at the worst part.

He meets Soma during the first year training camp, where he deems that he has much to learn in order to surpass Joichiro. He returns to Totsuki as a guest judge for the Fall Classic semifinals and finals. Although officially "neutral", Gin disagreed with Nakiri Azami's ideals and helped the rebels behind the scenes. He and Joichiro plotted to make Azami fall for a Shokugeki challenge after the Rebels (with the exception of Soma, Erina, Megumi and Takumi) are all expelled. After the plan is successful, Gin, Senzaemon and Joichiro coached the remaining four rebels in preparation for the Regimental Shokugeki.

Four months after the defeat of Azami, Gin was informed by one of Joichiro's American colleagues Dr. McFree that Asahi Saiba, who defeated Joichiro 5-0 in a Shokugeki, would most likely try to make contact with Joichiro's true son. Unfortunately for Gin and Erina, they are too late to realize that Asahi is already in Japan, disguised as a lecturer who Erina temporarily hired. He, Joichiro, Senzaemon and other Polaris dorm students (as well as Isshiki in anime only), including Eishi, Terunori, Ikumi, Alice, Hisako and recently redeemed Azami watches a semi-final between Soma and Asahi, where they learn from Azami the existence of God's Tongue curse within both Mana and Erina.

Tsukuda said that he originally intended only for Gin Dojima to transform Sailor Moon magical girl style in the magical cabbage story.

Kojiro Shinomiya

 is the owner of a French haute cuisine restaurant called Shino's. After graduating at the top of the 79th class, he moves to Paris, earning the moniker "Le magicien de légume" (The Vegetable Magician) for emphasizing vegetables and having a Japanese approach to a cuisine that has been mostly meat dishes. When his staff compromises his dishes, he hardens himself emotionally, and fires the staff, taking more of the burden himself. After achieving much success in his field and winning the Pluspol prize, he realizes he has been stagnant over the years.

During the first-year camp, he immediately fires a student for using a scented hair care product. When he expels Megumi Tadokoro for altering his recipe, Soma challenges him to a shokugeki, but director Gin Dojima has him compete against Megumi. Although he wins over the judges, Dojima and other alumni support Megumi's dish, and after trying her dish himself, he is reminded of his mother's kindness and withdraws his firing of Megumi. Although he does not participate as a judge for the Fall Classic, he returns in the story when Soma is assigned as a stagiaire (intern) at his new restaurant, Shino's Tokyo, where Soma tries to find his specialty and to get his dish added to Shinomiya's menu. He reveals that he chose to specialize in French cuisine in order to make his mother happy.

In the aftermath of Azami's seizure of Tōtsuki and Central's dubious actions (such as shutting down any Totsuki affiliate and replacing them with the businesses owned by his Central members), Shinomiya aids the remaining first-year rebels for their preparation against the eight remaining Central Council members before the Regiment de Cuisine starts; specifically, Shinomiya is tasked to coach Megumi for said upcoming matches. It is revealed that despite agreeing with Azami's ideal of "true gourmet", Shinomiya feels conflicted and realized something didn't seem right behind the truth of Azami's twisted ideal, and as such Shinomiya refused to let Azami control Shino's like a puppet. During the month of coaching the first year rebels for their Regimental Shokugeki, Soma introduced Shinomiya to his father Joichiro. Shinomiya believes that he has met Joichiro in the past, but cannot remember when. Around two years later, he was nominated by WGO a three stars award for the best Japanese Restaurant that were first established in France. In Le Dessert, Shinomiya is assisted by Council alumni Eishi and Rindo and both of his juniors often hangout and help out at his Tokyo branch when they have no busy overseas works.

The Shokugeki no Soma – Etoile spinoff manga focuses on Shinomiya's time in France after graduation. Tsukuda said that Jump J books wanted to feature Shinomiya in his own series.

Tsukuda and Saeki noted that Shinomiya's character was modeled loosely from several Japanese chefs, one of whom had opened restaurants in France with English or Japanese names to emphasize that he was a foreigner. In a similar way, they chose the restaurant to have an apostrophe.

Hinako Inui

, of the 80th graduating class, heads the Japanese-cuisine restaurant Kiri No Ya. During the first-year camp, she hosts a challenge where students have to cook a Japanese dish to her approval using ingredients found on-site. She is a bit absent-minded, purposely dawdling between choosing whether Soma or Takumi's dish is better until she is called to wrap up her assignment. She takes a liking towards Megumi Tadokoro. She is also fond of teasing Kojiro Shinomiya, which often results in the latter comically punishing her. She reappears in the Fall Classics semifinals as a judge and in the pre-opening of Shinomiya's restaurant in Japan.

As a student, she held the second seat in the Council of Ten, and was a feared chef known as the "Empress of Mist". At the graduation of Shinomiya, Fuyumi and Donato, she cried upon learning of Kojiro's departure to France, predicting that his abusive and unfriendly nature would cause quarrels with his staff, to which the others agree. She later challenged Kojiro to a shokugeki to not leave, but intentionally held back as she felt he should indeed go.

Fuyumi Mizuhara

, of the 79th graduating class and second seat on the Council, is the owner of the Italian restaurant Ristorante F. She is often irritated with Shinomiya because of his arrogant smirks, but at the same time respects him as a chef. She is often deadpan, sarcastic and serious compared to her light-hearted schoolmate Hinako Inui; she has short hair and is the only female judge who wears a tie and pants. She tried but failed to recruit the Aldini brothers and Soma for her restaurant at the conclusion of the first-year's summer camp. She reappears as a judge at the Fall Classic semifinals. A short story reveals that her dislike of Shinomiya stemmed from the fact that he upstaged her in Italian cuisine when they were students.

Taki Tsunozaki

, an 88th-generation graduate who held the second seat in the Council, she owns the Spanish restaurant Taki Amarillo which she opened a year after graduating. She first appears as a judge in the Fall Classic semifinals. She has long dark hair and has an aggressive and short temper, talking about beating up people she does not like. She bullies Sonoka because of the latter's large breasts; disrespects Hinako by calling her an old hag; but respects Fuyumi.

Sonoka Kikuchi

, a graduate of the 89th class and the second seat on the Council, owns a Western cuisine restaurant Shunkatei in which she opened within a year after graduating. She first appears in the Fall Classic semifinals. She has light hair tied in a ribbon and is fairly busty. She tends to get bossed around by her senpai Taki Tsunozaki. While judging Akira and Ryo's semifinal match in the Fall Classic, Sonoka is unable to decide until Gin Dojima intervenes.

Council of Ten Masters  

The Totsuki Council of Ten Masters is the student council consisting of the top ten students of the school. They are in charge of decision-making for practically all the issues for the school. They report directly to the dean, and even the teachers must comply with the Council's decisions.

The council's authority in the academy rivals that of the director/headmaster, and a majority of the Council of Ten can overrule the director's wishes or formally request a new director. The Council of Ten is responsible for handling the academy's internal evaluations and helping organize events. Its members are given large budgets by the academy to utilize in any cooking-related pursuit, and freedom to carry out personal projects such as Erina's kitchen expansion which resulted in the demolition and disbanding of many long-standing clubs.

The ten members are ranked, with the first seat being the best student in the academy, expected to have the most prominent future after graduation. Members will occasionally challenge each other for a higher seat on the council, and it is possible for a non-seated student to win a place through shokugeki, though a council member will rarely accept such a challenge. The majority of council members are second and third-year students, though Azami obtained the third seat in his first year, and Erina was granted a seat while still in the academy's junior high school.

According to Takumi, who is now a seventh seat in four months after Regiment was finished, and where new BLUE tournament begins, 0th seat exist, such as mostly applied to a headmaster-based student as Erina.

Etsuya Eizan

 is introduced as a second-year student who occupies the ninth seat on the Council. He has been a culinary consultant for a number of businesses since junior high, including Mozuya's fried chicken businesses, whose success Soma foiled by making a better fried chicken store in the shopping district. His nickname is "The Alchemist". Satoshi Isshiki perceives Eizan as a delinquent who had organized his own gang in junior high, and a yakuza mastermind.

He is manipulative, nefarious, often with a fiendish aura, and presents himself as a puppet-master, working behind the scenes to get his way. In the Fall Classic, he fixes the semifinal match between Subaru Mimasaka and Soma Yukihara so that Subaru takes advantage of Soma's rivalry with Takumi Aldini to provoke Soma into turning the match into a shokugeki. Isshiki warns Eizan that Soma will not fall for his traps.

Eizan supported Azami as Totsuki's new director and arrogantly visited the academy's clubs to announce their disbandment. In order to show Central's power, he defeats skewer research society leader Tetsuji Kabutoyama by rigging the judges so that they would vote for Eizan's dish without even tasting his opponents' dish. However, he is defeated when Soma challenges him and persuades the rigged judges to try his dish. Afterwards, he remains with Central where he takes over Isshiki's seventh seat and easily defeats other challengers that were hoping to save their research societies with other rigged judges. He hopes to get revenge for his loss against Soma, but is defeated by a vengeful Takumi during the Regiment De Cuisine. Four months after Rebels' victory, it is revealed that he was pardoned and returned to the Council at eighth seat after the events of the BLUE. He later graduates after the BLUE tournament is over. After the Jewel Generation students graduated, Eizan is now having more legal collaborative meat businesses with Ikumi and Yoshino.

Eishi Tsukasa

 is a third-year student with short light hair who is introduced as the first seat of the Council. An extremely talented chef, Eishi was nicknamed "the teacher killer" during middle school as teachers were knocked-down at the power of tasting his dishes. Despite his high position, he suffers from stage fright and avoids public speaking, and often questions whether he can do his job, prompting the other council members to either reassure him or to let him be. However, he has absolute confidence in his cooking and never asks his customers how his food tastes, asking instead about other things like ambiance. He specializes in European gourmet cuisine, and due to his all-white color scheme, he is known in the culinary world as Der Weiße Ritter der Tafel (lit. 'The White Knight of Table'). As a fellow food elitist, he supported Azami's ideals, including the closing of all cooking establishments throughout Japan, then worldwide, that are deemed to be inferior. Originally, he wanted to recruit both Soma and Satoshi as his pawns within Central's ranks, but both juniors rejected his offer due to their loyalty towards their fellow rebel friends and the endangered cooking establishments. Before meeting Azami, Eishi originally only wanted to improve his cooking skills. However, after obtaining the first seat, Eishi was invited to cook in America, where he met Azami and was persuaded by his ideals. After narrowly defeating Kuga and Isshiki, Eishi is defeated, alongside Rindo, by the Soma-Erina duo. From his loss, Eishi learned that Soma and Erina won because they actually enjoyed their cooking. Four months after the Rebels' victory, after Eishi and most of the other Central members were pardoned, he graduated alongside the other third-year students, he is last seen with Rindo fishing in the Amazon river. Eishi is later invited to BLUE and reunites with Soma, Megumi and Takumi. Unfortunately, in the official finals, he is defeated by the Noir's leader Asahi and had his kebab knife being stolen by him afterward. Prior being invited to BLUE where Asahi defeated Eishi and steal his newly owned kebab knife, Eishi was challenged by Soma numerous times while the former was about to graduate from the academy. Seeing Soma's surrender-less nature, Eishi was glad to fully remember Soma. It was revealed when he and Rindo comes back to Japan after overseas works, they are often hangout and help out at SHINO’S Tokyo branch.

Rindo Kobayashi
 

 is a third-year student who is introduced as the second seat of the Council. She is described as "friendly, sociable and easy-going", with medium-length red hair that covers part of her face. She is friends with Tsukasa since meeting in junior high. She has a vast knowledge of all things pertaining to ingredients, from carving techniques to butchering methods, and an unfathomable curiosity towards all tastes under the sun. She is known as the Rare Ingredients Master.

From the moment she entered the Council of Ten, Rindō made full use of her authority to travel across the globe to search for new rare ingredients. From the top of Chinese mountains to deserts and the North Pole, and the Amazon Rainforest. Having already made herself quite versed in whatever rare ingredients that could be found in Japan itself, she managed to achieve further, almost explosive growth by acquainting herself with the sort of unique ingredients that were inaccessible outside of their place of origin. There were even a few new species that she and on-site staff discovered as part of their projects. Once they determined that the removal of these new species did not affect the ecosystem, Rindo would use them to create new dishes. During the Moon Festival in Soma's first year, instead of running a booth, she sampled food from all 120 participating booths.

When Azami took over as headmaster, she was one of the Council members who supported him, as she thought it would make things more exciting (also because she was influenced by Eishi's decision). She is not fully influenced by Azami's ideals: she disagrees with the expulsion of Isshiki, Megishima, and Kuga from the Council of Ten; was reluctant to wear Central's badge; and gave easy tests to Takumi and Megumi in the third phase of the Promotional Exam. Eventually, her loyalty starts to waver in earnest when she sees how Central treats other culinary businesses. Her true reason for siding with Central is related to Eishi, as he had fallen for Azami's manipulation ever since they met in America after obtaining their current Council of Ten seats, and her desire to prevent any further manipulation. After her and Eishi's loss in the final Regimental Shokugeki match, Rindō no longer worried about Azami's corrupting influence on Eishi anymore, as Central had officially fallen. Four months after the Rebels' victory, with Rindo and most of the other Central members were pardoned and graduated alongside the other third-year students, she is last seen with Eishi fishing in the Amazon river. It was revealed when she and Eishi comes back to Japan after overseas works, they are often hangout and help out at SHINO’S Tokyo branch.

In an interview at Anime Expo, Tsukuda said that Rindo was a popular character that he considered writing a version of the story with her as the main character.

Tosuke Megishima

 is a third-year student who is introduced as occupying the third seat in the Council where he wears a knit hat with dangling balls. He did not support Azami, and was dismissed from the Council of Ten after Azami's installation as the new director. Megishima has a deep passion for ramen, and is known as the 'Shokugeki Hater' at Totsuki. He despises the Shokugeki as he believes the only competition any chef should have is to make their customers happy. He is well known nationally in the ramen industry and has helped ramen restaurants to grow and flourish, developing a young Yakuza boss persona. After the Azami Administration take-over, a lot of these restaurants are coerced and bullied out of business and Megishima works to help them to stay afloat despite the pressure.

Originally, Megishima declined to join the rebel team as he wished to focus on the helping the ramen industry and because he despised Shokugekis in general. Soma attempted to recruit him in person, and managed to irritate him by his reckless big talk. An angry Megishima bested Soma in various ramen-themed matches before being intrigued and touched by the young Yukihira's passion for unique, creative, free-style cooking. He then joins the Rebels in the Regiment de Cuisine against Central. Despite losing in the second bout to Rindō, his 'African Ramen' still managed to significantly weaken her. He is also the one who first noticed Rindō's doubt about how Azami treated other food businesses, since she is not really influenced by the second headmaster's ideal and only voted him in because Tsukasa did. Four months after Rebels' victory, Megishima opens a ramen stall in Paris.

Momo Akanegakubo

 is introduced as a third-year student who occupies the fourth seat on the Council. She is a petite girl who enjoys toys and cute things; she is often seen with a stuffed toy cat named , whose hands also double as oven mitts. As a child, Momo had a knack for picking toys which later becomes very popular, leading to many manufacturers consulting her for toy designs. Eventually, Momo created social media accounts such as Instagram, Facebook, and Twitter for her selfies. Momo specializes in western-style desserts and sweets, and her pâtisserie was ranked first-in-sales during the Moon Banquet Festival. At time after Azami Nakiri is voted as a second headmaster of Totsuki by Momo and five other Council of Ten members, Momo is promoted to the third seat due to Megishima's dismissal. She can be anti-social and arrogant at first, but once she becomes more familiar with someone, she can become quite chatty. She likes to give pet names to people she deems inferior to her, ending with '-yan'; e.g. 'Soum-yan'. She has a fear of flying on airplanes. Momo does not approve of dishes that make use of different techniques to hers and deems them not cute and unworthy of 100%. In the Regimént de Cuisine, Momo narrowly defeats Megumi by one vote in the third bout but loses to Erina in the fourth. After the Rebels' victory, Momo is pardoned and allowed to graduate alongside the other third-year students. Four months later, Momo puts her skill as a patissier to good use and opening a business.

Somei Saito
 

 is introduced as a third-year student who first occupies the fifth seat on the Council, carrying a sushi knife in a wooden sheath. A skilled sushi chef who strictly follows the bushido code. Hailed from a small, but popular, sushi family diner owned by his mother, Saito vow to be a great chef as her. As Saito enters Totsuki at middle school, his mother got an apprenticeship at a famous sushi restaurant, Shigarami. However, things turn for the worst for them as the misogynistic Shiragami refuses the latter any access to the kitchen and assigned her doing menial tasks. Eventually, Saito's mother became ill from overwork. Vowing to protect his family diner, Saito honed his skills at Totsuki and crushed all opposing sushi restaurants who tries to ruin his diner's reputation, including Shiragami, in various competitions. With his sword, "Isanakiri" (whale cutter), used in his cooking, Saito developed his "Sushido" code, and earning a place in the Council of Ten council, where he is often considered a little eccentric with his samurai voracity and persona. Considering rebellion is a transgression against the bushido code, Saitou fights for Azami despite not fully espousing to the latter's ideals. At time after Azami is voted as a second headmaster of Totsuki by Somei and other five Council of Ten members, Somei is promoted to the fourth seat, whereas Momo is promoted to the third seat. After defeating Subaru in the second bout, he is defeated by Soma during the third bout of the Regiment de Cuisine, fully acknowledging Soma's strength. After Rebels' victory, Somei is one of Central members to be pardoned and graduate alongside other third-year students. Four months later, Somei officially takes over his family's sushi restaurant.

Nene Kinokuni

 is introduced as a second-year student who occupies the sixth seat on the Council; she wears glasses and has hair styled in short braided pigtails. She hails from the eastern Kanda, whose family runs a famous Soba restaurant, serving “Edo Soba,” and it's a well-known restaurant and serves one of the best Soba in Japan, which mainly serving the 1st flour Soba. Ever since she was little, she was taught the principles of tea ceremonies, Kaiseki cooking and basically anything that involves traditional Japanese food and the arts.

Her family, along with the Isshiki family, are the two most revered and respected culinary families in traditional Japanese food. As heir to his family, Isshiki Satoshi was sent to the Kinokuni household at 4 years old to train. Although initially Nene tried to get along with Satoshi, she grew jealous of him who seems to be surpassing her quickly in skills. This resentment is compounded when they both entered Totsuki and the Council of Ten. Even though Nene was ranked higher than Isshiki in the Council of Ten, everyone knew the only reason that was the case is because Satoshi did not do his best, and often held back his true skills. However, it is revealed that Satoshi was actually floundering in his cooking, and secretly admires Nene's determination and passion, as he had none until he met her. She is defeated by Soma in the first bout of the Regiment de Cuisine. Following her loss, she wonders where Soma gets his strength from.

Four months after the Rebels' victory, it is revealed that she is pardoned to return to Council on behalf of Soma's wisdom, albeit being demoted to ninth seat by some of the current second-years. After the events of BLUE, she later graduates. She currently went to learn more about traditional Japanese cuisine outside Kinokuni Family's Tradition.

Terunori Kuga
 

 is introduced as a second-year student who occupies the eighth seat on the Council. His hair is mostly light in front and dark in the back. He leads the Chinese Food Research Society, which has turned into a club that focuses on Sichuan cuisine, where he trains dozens of students with army-like efficiency to follow his recipes. He is the most talkative of the Council and has a short fuse, offering to give Soma a chance to challenge him to a shokugeki if he can beat him in any single category that involves cooking.

As a child, Kuga traveled widely and was interested in Chinese cuisine, including Sichuan, Hunan, and Guizhou cuisines. As a first year at Totsuki, like Soma, he challenged the Council to a shokugeki during the meet and greet, with Tsukasa accepting and defeating him. Tsukasa promises him another battle if he could achieve first in sales in his area for the Moon Festival. During the festival, he hosts a large booth that specializes in mapo tofu as well as a handful of other very spicy but addictive dishes, but Soma manages to best his sales on the fourth day which angers Kuga as it means he cannot challenge Tsukasa again. When Azami took over as headmaster, Kuga was one of the members who did not approve and was soon dismissed from the council. The Chinese RS was not said to be shut down. He later appeared during the Promotional Exams to help Soma prepare for his match against Akira Hayama, then joins the rebel team in Regiment de Cuisine for a rematch against Tsukasa. Kuga still lost, but managed to land a significant blow to Tsukasa in their match. Four months after the Rebels' victory, Kuga returns to the Council once more as the third seat, succeeding Tosuke and the pardoned Momo, who are now graduated. After the events of BLUE, he later graduates.

Julio Shiratsu

 is a second year student who is introduced as a temporarily appointed eight seat for Central's Council of Ten. He is very flamboyant and loud. He also admires Isshiki, while bearing a grudge on him at the same time. His family is well known as the chefs for the Italian embassy for generations. Julio later lost to Isshiki during the first bout of the Regiment de Cuisine.

Shoko Kaburagi

 is a second-year student who is introduced as a temporarily appointed fifth seat for Central's Council of Ten. She looks like a male while wearing her chef uniform and her hat. She likes apple tea and watching tennis, but has a strong dislike of spiders and the smell of tobacco. She lost to Tosuke Megishima during the Regiment de Cuisine.

Central Gourmet Institute
Central (officially, Central Gourmet Institute) is a ruling organization within Totsuki which supplanted the Council of Ten during the Azami Administration. It is composed of students selected by Azami, including the six Council of Ten members who supported him as director. Central was created as a student-run organization to assist Azami's goal of educating all academy students with the skills and techniques to cook dishes at a Council of Ten level. Central dictates what dishes the students are required to make and the correct recipe and method for their preparation. Any attempt modify or defy these choices resulted in stiff reprimanding from proctors and professors. The rebel students consider Central to be nothing more than Azami's puppets, copying the techniques of others with no confidence of their own. With the Rebels' victory in the Regimental Shokugeki, Central was officially disbanded. Others who were brainwashed and manipulated by Central were pardoned by Soma as the new First Seat. However, their defeat was just the beginning, with an even bigger threat, an illegal chef group Le Cuisine Noir, resurface from the shadows and happens to be invited to BLUE in four months later.

Azami Nakiri

, born  is Erina's father who returns from banishment to become the second headmaster of Totsuki in the 16th to 30th volume of the series. He was once a well-respected Council member who was two years younger than Joichiro. He establishes the organization known as Central to put into effect sweeping changes in a scheme to achieve his ideal of a "gourmet utopia". Four months later when the new BLUE Tournament starts, Azami reveals the reason behind his madness and subsequent banishment from Totsuki was because of an incident that his wife Mana suffered from the curse of the God's Tongue, similar to the mounting pressure Joichiro faced in his senior year at Totsuki. This affected Erina's life as well, as Azami attempts to save Erina from her mother's fate through strenuous "training" in the form of emotional, psychological, and sometimes physical abuse, causing her hardened attitude toward cuisine. It is revealed that prior to meeting Mana, Azami had an affair with Asahi's mother, leaving Azami unaware of Azahi's birth. Two years after the BLUE is over, Azami was pardoned to enter Totsuki again while also being informed of Asahi being his eldest son. Azami decides to leave the Nakiri household to live with Asahi, but Erina invites her brother to the household.

Shawn Aida

Azami Nakiri's secretary.

Rentaro Kusunoki

 is an arrogant second-year student and member of Central. He wears a bandanna, a tattoo on his left cheek, and crosses on his cooking outfit. His specialty is low-temperature cooking techniques. Sent by Azami to demolish the Cutting Edge Cooking Society, he calls the first-years "lowlifes" when de facto captain Alice Nakiri is indifferent about giving up the club. The insult leads Ryō Kurokiba to challenge and defeat Rentarō in a Shokugeki, causing Central to lose face. He was pardoned to return to Totsuki at Soma's behalf, and later graduates.

Mea Yanai

A second-year student with pink hair and a haughty attitude. She lost to Ikumi in the second survival match. She was pardoned to return to Totsuki at Soma's behalf and manage to graduate for two years.

Shigemichi Kumai

Nicknamed 'Shige', he is a second-year student with a brutish appearance. However, unlike his fellow Central members and despite his appearance, Shige is a very reasonable chef with a code of honor. He lost to Megumi in the second survival match against the Regional Cooking RS. He was pardoned to return to Totsuki at Soma's behalf and manage to graduate for two years.

Rui Kofuru

A mysterious second-year student with long white hair and bangs over her eyes (like Shun Ibusaki). In anime, it is revealed that she is defeated by Marui during Survival's Purge against his Literature Culinary Club. She was pardoned to return to Totsuki at Soma's behalf and manage to graduate for two years.

Le Cuisiner Noir
Le Cuisiner Noir (The Midnight Chefs) are a mysterious group of underground chefs who dabble in intimidation, kidnapping, sabotages, and to achieve an end, they will not shy away from torture and even murder. They are considered an illegal band of dark chefs. The Noir's exact goal is unknown, but they do specialize in using various tools like chainsaws and graters to cut or present in unusual ways and getting very rare and highly illegal but tasty ingredients. Four months after the collapse of Azami Administration at Regiment match, Le Cuisine Noir began to resurface from the shadow and somehow being invited to BLUE. The anime's season finale reveals after Asahi found out he is related to Azami and Nakiri family, the Noir officially became a legal chef group of Totsuki.

Tsukuda said that the last group of antagonists were inspired from having an old shonen trope of final group of enemies as with the cooking manga Chūka Ichiban! Tsukuda also said in a Viz Media interview that it is also common to have an underworld organization. They were inspired by having gone to a super-expensive restaurant in a hotel where it is very hard to get a reservation, and thought about places that were so exclusive that only politicians and those with money go, and exaggerated that into writing in crazy dishes and even illegal ones.

Monarch
An American chef who called himself Monarch is the first known member of Le Cuisine Noir. He disguise himself as a tourist to infiltrates Japan and has a dislike towards the said country's cuisine by destroying the inn places where the now retired principal of Totsuki Senzaemon use to visit, until the interference of the current Council of Ten Masters members Soma and Megumi. He use to have past memory where he truly loved his mother most. After being defeated by Megumi, Monarch redeemed himself by Megumi's kindness and her cuisine, eventually explains who the Noir's leader is, whom Monarch only know is his last name "Saiba", but not the same Saiba whom Soma, Erina and Megumi knew when the real Saiba, Joichiro confirms that other "Saiba" was an adopted son, who is named Asahi. For some reason, Monarch somehow lost his knife by the hands of his former boss, who then use it against Megumi at BLUE.

Asahi Saiba

 is the leader of Le Cuisiner Noirs. Asahi's specialty is "Cross-Knives" where he can instantaneously assimilate the special skills of many chefs by just holding their signature utensils and even multiply those skills to create unprecedented dishes. Asahi is revealed to be Azami's son. When Azami was still in high school, he had a one-night stand with an American woman and unwittingly sired Asahi. This was before Azami had met Mana.

Twenty years ago, Azami carelessly abandoned Asahi and his mother, and they led a poor life in America. Asahi was often abused by his alcoholic mother. By the time his mother died, the young Asahi was being sent to an orphanage. Some time during his childhood, he met Joichiro, who then took him in as his only disciple. Soma has a feeling that he has met Asahi before, but he is not sure. Joichiro visited Asahi every time he traveled to America for whatever reason. When Joichiro's wife Tamako passed away in front of the younger Soma's eyes, Joichiro tells Asahi that he is no longer able to visit America as he has to take care of Soma. Due to this, Asahi accuses Soma for "stealing" his "father" and wished he was born as Soma. At some point in time after that, he took up Joichiro's former surname as his own, thus becoming Asahi Saiba, and even becoming infamous within the underground gourmet society of America. It was revealed when Joichiro unable to return to Asahi due to his wife's death, Asahi was given by Joichiro his old knife from Totsuki as supposed to be a gift for a good use, but Asahi uses it for his selfish gain, even never understood the meaning of Jōichiro's teaching.

Around four months after the collapse of the Azami Administration, Asahi sent several midnight chefs invade Japan, causing Shokugeki damage to particular areas, prompting Erina to send the Council of Ten Masters out on "business trips" in order to gain information on their intentions. Asahi soon infiltrated into Totsuki under the guise of a Lecturer and challenge and defeat Soma in a Cooking Match  with the intention making Erina his wife by challenging her to a cooking showdown at the BLUE. However, Soma defeated him in a revenge match at the BLUE semifinals, preventing Asahi from confronting Erina.

About a year after the BLUE tournament, Asahi discovered that Azami is his biological father and Erina is his younger half-sister. Erina requests him to join the Nakiri family after discovering their true relation from Azami. Many years after all Jewel Generation students graduation from Totsuki, Asahi, now renamed as  has officially become a teacher at Totsuki's middle and high schools, where he is highly popular there.

In an interview from Viz Media's Team Jump, when asked if Asahi was the ultimate rival character to Soma, Tsukuda said that "I designed Asahi as someone who's wearing the same skin as Soma but is completely different underneath. He's not the opposite, just different. And the purpose of Asahi is to highlight the different themes that define Soma and Erina."

Yunosuke
 is a second in-command and a Japanese spy for Le Cuisine Noir. Before BLUE, he was the one who kidnapped Erina into joining BLUE under Asahi's order and the one who helped Asahi infiltrate Japan. Yunosuke was able to access the confidential information regarding the God Tongue and the situation of the Nakiri family. He also helped Asahi infiltrate Tōtsuki in the first place. By the time when Asahi learned his late-mother had a one-night stand with Azami, both Yunosuke and Sarge confirms their leader that Azami is in fact his biological father.

Sarge

 is a stern and intolerant military-themed chef of Le Cuisiner Noir. She uses a chainsaw as her preferred cooking tool. After skipping the three qualification phases of BLUE, she reaches the one-on-one battle area where her opponent is Soma, and the theme is "Christmas cake". Sarge arrogantly dismisses Soma as a small fry based on what Asahi had told her, but Soma effortlessly defeats her. Sarge still believes he is no match for Asahi due to the difference in abilities, eventually becoming her and Noir members’ big mistake for underestimate Soma's true surrender-less nature, whether he fail or win. By the time when Asahi learned his late-mother had a one-night stand with Azami, both Sarge and Yunosuke confirms their leader that Azami is in fact his biological father.

Don Kalma

 is a flamboyant bartender-themed chef of Le Cuisiner Noir. He has over 20 transvestism gay-men on his side as his sous chefs, referring them as his “children”, much as they called him “mama”. After skipping the three qualification phases of BLUE, he reaches the team battle where his opponent is Takumi. Before the battle, he secretly sabotages the match by kidnapping Takumi's little brother Isami, until Soma, who defeated Sarge arrived on time to aid his sworn ally and friendly rival. He is then defeated by Soma and Takumi's Yin Yang dish, at the same time when the two BLUE event guards manage to rescue Isami.

Kou Shiou
A masked subordinate of Asahi Saiba, Kou Shiou hails from a Chinese assassin family who adapted their assassination techniques into cooking. Shiou is regarded as the top five strongest candidates of BLUE and he wields steel claws that can shred meat as well as transfuse the food with five kinds of seasoning mix, each appealing the five tastes. He is beaten by Megumi Tadokoro.

Other recurring characters

Mayumi Kurase

 is Soma's childhood friend since kindergarten. She first appeared as a taste-tester in one of Soma and Joichiro's cooking contests at the start of the series. She has a crush on Soma, and is constantly pressured by her friends to confess to him. Mayumi assists Soma and Ikumi in reviving their market district which was losing business to a popular fried chicken chain opening in the train station, stealing the district's customers. After Soma returns to Totsuki, Mayumi helps Yuya Tomita in running the district's fried-chicken shop.

Leonora Nakiri

 is Alice's mother and co-head of Nakiri International, first appearing as a judge for the Fall Classic Finals along with Gin Dojima and Senzaemon Nakiri. She is very kind and loving but has difficulty speaking Japanese, as she was Danish. However, when she tastes an exceptional dish, she would do her own version of "stripping" by describing the dish in detail in perfect Japanese. Like her daughter, Leonora is very knowledgeable in molecular gastronomy, and her eyes comically deform into cartoonish shapes when she is flustered or emotional.

Soe Nakiri

Sōe is Alice's father, Leonora's husband, Senzaemon's son and co-head of Nakiri International. During the third phase of the Promotional Exams, he and Gin Dōjima attended the revenge match between Akira Hayama and Soma Yukihira, acting as neutral judges to ensure a fair result. He loves his family dearly, much like his brother-in-law Azami was before the God's Tongue curse incident relating to his sister, Mana and her departure from Nakiri manors, which resulted Azami's downfall.

Berta and Cilla
 (Berta) 
 (Cilla)

They are the two staff members under the Research Division of Nakiri International and Leonora Nakiri's subordinates. During the third phase of the Promotional Exams, they attended the match between Akira Hayama and Soma Yukihira, acting as neutral judges to ensure a fair result. After hearing Alice lost to Soma, it is revealed that they became big fans of his and gladly met him in person.

Anne

Anne is a First Class Bookman from the World Gourmet Organization who acted as the Head Judge for Regiment De Cuisine between the Rebels and Central, then later attends BLUE four months after. She informs the Bookmaster Mana Nakiri, Erina's mother of Soma's true identity as Joichiro's son, with Mana is now expecting something unique from Soma as a result. For some reason, Anne admits herself that she along with most of WGO members never knew Mana's identity as the organization's Bookmaster until recently before the BLUE.

Mana Nakiri

The mother of Erina, the daughter of Senzaemon, the second wife of Azami and sister of Soe. She is the Bookmaster of World Gourmet Organization. Her daughter, Erina, holds a larger grudge towards her mother than her previous fear of her father, as Mana's departure caused Azami's madness and thus, Erina's torturous "training" in the first place. When being informed of Soma's existence as Joichiro's son from Anne, Mana is interested to see his true potential during BLUE.

Like Erina, Mana was also possessor the God Tongue, but she became unable to enjoy food because she could taste imperfections in every single one of them in the few years after giving birth to Erina when her daughter was still young. This caused to despair and lose all hope in food and as a result, she left the Nakiri family. Currently Mana is being fed intravenously. After the BLUE, she was the one who discovered Asahi being Azami's illegitimate son, and Azami himself willingly took a responsibility to watch over him. As Erina wants to pardon her father and her half-brother into the main family, Mana felt a same thing as her daughter, feeling that the main family of Nakiri members shall be loners no more.

Tamako Yukihira

The mother of Soma, and the wife of Joichiro. She first met Joichiro Saiba and helped him recover from his taxing experiences at Totsuki. After they marry, they conceive a son, Soma. Despite being revealed to be an awful chef, she was loved and highly respected by many customers of her home diner ever when she was a yankee back in her high school day, and failure was the key to her success as with her husband Joichiro, influencing their son Soma. The only specialty she succeeded at was a fried rice-based cuisine. Sometime when Joichiro was in the middle of business trip in America, Tamako died by an incurable heart defect that caused a heart attack, leaving Joichiro no choice but to stay in Japan to watch over Soma until he grew up. Her son, Soma carries her will after her passing. She is survived by her father Kazusato, the retired original owner of Yukihira Diner. The last meal she and Soma made was a pilaf fried rice, which is later used in the present day during the BLUE tournament by Soma to undo the God's Tongue curse within one of the Nakiri family members. Two years later after the BLUE with Soma still overseas, Erina and Hisako are right on time to ask Joichiro who Tamako was, whereas Mana and Azami overhear it as well at the same time to reveal whom Asahi truly was.

Works cited
 "Ch." is shortened form for chapter and refers to a chapter number of the Food Wars!: Shokugeki no Soma manga
 "Ep." is shortened form for Episode and refers to an Episode number of the Food Wars!: Shokugeki no Soma anime

Notes

References

External links
  at Viz.com

Food Wars: Shokugeki no Soma